Parallel rulers are a drafting instrument used by navigators to draw parallel lines on charts. The tool consists of two straight edges joined by two arms which allow them to move closer or further away while always remaining parallel to each other.

History
The parallel ruler was invented in about 1584 by Fabrizio Mordente, but it was not in common use until the 18th century.

In the 19th century a retired sea captain, Captain William Andrew Field improved the design by adding a protractor-style scale to the upper edge of one rule, and compass points to the opposing edge, which made reading bearings easier. Examples exist of boxwood, ivory or ebony, usually with brass hinges. The instrument usually had two links, but longer models sometimes had three, and sometimes the links were scissored. Another variation is the "roller" model which included a cylindrical roller for ease of use.

See also
 Cras protractor
 Technical drawing tools

Notes

References

External links 
 How to use parallel rulers

Navigational equipment